NGC 4881 is an elliptical galaxy in the northern constellation of Coma Berenices. It was discovered by the German astronomer Heinrich Louis d'Arrest on April 22, 1865. John L. E. Dreyer described it as "faint, small, a little extended, 9th magnitude star to southwest".

The morphological class of this galaxy is E0, indicating it is an elliptical galaxy with a spherically symmetric form. It does not display any unusual or peculiar features. It has an unusually low frequency of globulars for a galaxy of this type.


See also
 Mice Galaxies
 Virgo A

References

External links 
 
 APOD: Elliptical Galaxy NGC 4881 in Coma (11/6/1996)
 HST: Galaxy NGC 4881 and the Coma cluster
 Coma Cluster at ESA/Hubble

Elliptical galaxies
Coma Cluster
Coma Berenices
4881
08106
44686